The Black Mountain transmitting station is a broadcasting and telecommunications facility, situated on land  above Ordnance Datum (mean sea level) to the west of the city of Belfast, in Northern Ireland. It is owned and operated by Arqiva.

History

Construction
It was built by BICC.

Transmission
1959: The station is commissioned by the Independent Television Authority to transmit ITV signals (provided by Ulster Television) on 405-line VHF, using Channel 9 (Band III) on high power. Service commences on 1 October.
1970: UHF 625-line PAL colour TV begins at high power from the adjacent Divis transmitting station.
1975: A low power UHF filler service begins, designed to cover districts close to the station that cannot pick up Divis.
1976: FM commercial radio station Downtown Radio (later Cool FM) starts transmissions.
1985: VHF 405-line television is discontinued in the UK, having been replaced by the UHF service. The VHF service from Black Mountain closes.
1990: FM commercial radio station BCR (later City Beat) now Q Radio begins on 96.7 MHz on 6 April.
1997: Analogue transmissions of Channel 5 begin at high power.
2001: DAB Digital Radio transmissions start from Score Northern Ireland on block 12D on 6 September.
2005: FM station U105 begins on 105.8 MHz on 14 November.
2012: On 24 October analogue television services are ceased and replaced by digital multiplexes. NImux launches at this and two other transmitter sites in Northern Ireland transmitting TG4, RTÉ One, RTÉ Two and RTÉ Raidió na Gaeltachta to the region.
2019: Further frequency changes took place in September as part of the 700 MHz clearance plan for new mobile telecom services,

Coverage
For high power transmissions of Cool FM, and formerly analogue Channel 5, coverage includes most of central and eastern Ulster, north as far as Ballymena, south as far as Downpatrick and Newry, and west past Dungannon and Cookstown.

Radio stations Q Radio and U105 have a more restricted coverage area, including areas around Greater Belfast, up to Carrickfergus, Antrim, and the shore of Lough Neagh.

With the exception of the NIMM broadcasts, the low power digital TV transmissions are designed only to cover areas of Belfast not already covered by Divis.

Service availability by frequency

Analogue radio

Digital radio

Analogue television

31 October 1959 – 8 August 1975

8 August 1975 – 2 November 1982

2 November 1982 – 3 January 1985

3 January 1985 – 30 March 1997

30 March 1997 – 10 October 2012

Analogue and digital television

10 October 2012 – 24 October 2012

Digital television

24 October 2012 – present
Digital television replaced the old analogue signals during October 2012. An additional multiplex named NImux including TG4, RTÉ One, RTÉ Two and RTÉ Raidió na Gaeltachta launched at switchover here and at two other transmitters in Northern Ireland. In September 2019 further frequency changes took place.

See also
List of masts
List of tallest buildings and structures in the United Kingdom
List of radio stations in the United Kingdom

References

External links
The Transmission Gallery: Black Mountain Photographs and Information

Transmitter sites in Northern Ireland
1959 establishments in Northern Ireland
Towers completed in 1959
Buildings and structures in Belfast